The men's 1500 metres event at the 1961 Summer Universiade was held at the Vasil Levski National Stadium in Sofia, Bulgaria, with the final on 3 September 1961.

Medalists

Results

Heats

Final

References

Athletics at the 1961 Summer Universiade
1961